Jameh Mosque of Arak the Jumu'ah venue of Arak, which is located at the beginning of Bazaar of Arak.

See also
 Islam in Iran

References

Mosques in Iran
Mosque buildings with domes
National works of Iran
Arak